{{Automatic taxobox
|taxon = Isara
|image = Isara nigra (MNHN-IM-2000-30265).jpeg
|image_caption = Shell of Isara nigra (syntype at MNHN, Paris)
|authority = H. Adams & A. Adams, 1853
|synonyms_ref = 
|synonyms=
Mitra (Fuscomitra) Pallary, 1900
Mitra (Isara) H. Adams & A. Adams, 1853
|type_species= Mitra bulimoides Reeve, 1844 
|subdivision_ranks = Species
|subdivision = See text
|display_parents = 3
}}Isara is a genus of sea snails, marine gastropod mollusks in the family Mitridae.

Species
Species within the genus Isara include:

 Isara aerumnosa (Melvill, 1888)
 Isara aikeni (Lussi, 2009)
 Isara antillensis (Dall, 1889)
 Isara badia (Reeve, 1844)
 Isara beui (Thach, 2016)
 Isara carbonaria (Swainson, 1822)
 Isara chalybeia (Reeve, 1844)
 Isara chinensis (Gray, 1834)
 Isara cookii (G. B. Sowerby II, 1874)
 Isara cornea (Lamarck, 1811)
 Isara declivis (Reeve, 1844)
 Isara gabonensis (Biraghi, 1984)
 Isara glabra (Swainson, 1821)
 Isara goreensis (Melvill, 1925)
 Isara joostei (Lussi, 2009)
 Isara lenhilli (Petuch, 1988)
 Isara midwayensis (Kosuge, 1979)
 Isara nigra (Gmelin, 1791)
 Isara pele (Cernohorsky, 1970)
 Isara peterclarksoni (Marrow, 2013)
 Isara picta (Reeve, 1844)
 Isara slacksmithae (Marrow, 2013)
 Isara straminea (A. Adams, 1853)
 Isara swainsonii (Broderip, 1836)
 Isara turtoni (E. A. Smith, 1890)
 Isara ulala'' (Garcia, 2011)

References

External links
 Adams H. & Adams A. (1853-1858). The genera of Recent Mollusca; arranged according to their organization. London, van Voorst.
 Pallary, P. (1900). Coquilles marines du littoral du département d'Oran. Journal de Conchyliologie. 48(3): 211-422
 Fedosov A., Puillandre N., Herrmann M., Kantor Yu., Oliverio M., Dgebuadze P., Modica M.V. & Bouchet P. (2018). The collapse of Mitra: molecular systematics and morphology of the Mitridae (Gastropoda: Neogastropoda). Zoological Journal of the Linnean Society. 183(2): 253-337
 Cossmann, M. (1899). Essais de paléoconchologie comparée. Troisième livraison. Paris, The author and Comptoir Géologique. 201 pp., 8 pls

 
Mitridae
Gastropod genera